USS Doris Miller (CVN-81) is a future  of the United States Navy. Doris Miller is scheduled to be laid down January 2026, launched October 2029 and commissioned in 2032. She will be built at Newport News Shipbuilding, a division of Huntington Ingalls Industries (formerly Northrop Grumman Shipbuilding) in Newport News, Virginia.

Naming 
The ship, named for Messman Second Class Doris Miller, is the first aircraft carrier named for both an enlisted sailor and an African-American person.

Construction
On 25 August 2021, with six members of Doris Miller's family in attendance, the Navy conducted the First Cut of Steel ceremony at Newport News Shipbuilding, signaling the formal start of construction for the fourth Ford-class aircraft carrier.

See also
 List of aircraft carriers of the United States Navy

References

Gerald R. Ford-class aircraft carriers